"Speak to Me" is the first track on British progressive rock band Pink Floyd's 1973 album, The Dark Side of the Moon, on which it forms an overture. Nick Mason receives a rare solo writing credit for the track, though recollections differ as to the reasons for this. Mason states that he created the track himself, whereas Richard Wright and Roger Waters stated the credit was a "gift" to Mason to give him some publishing income (subsequently regretted by the latter, following his acrimonious departure from the band). Live versions are included on Pulse (1995) and The Dark Side of the Moon Live at Wembley 1974 (2023).

Recording 
On 23 June 1972 a brief sound collage had been pieced together featuring parts recorded from completed songs by that date; not much work would continue. Waters later began to compile a series of questions that tied to the concept of the album; he wrote the questions on cards and paced them in the recording booth where sat those who were to answer the questions - they would read the question silently and then speak their answer which would be recorded. One of these questions was “What’s your favourite colour?", which was intended to ease the interviewee into the conversation. The questions would then escalate to questions like, “When was last time you thumped someone?", "Why did you do it?", "Were you in the right?", "Are you afraid of dying?", “Do you think you’re going mad?”, and "What do you think of the dark side of the moon?".

On 1 November 1972, whilst Paul McCartney was in one of the other studios recording Red Rose Speedway, Waters decided to ask McCartney and his wife, Linda to take part in the questions, recording their answers. The song would be worked on during the same day. Later, while mixing the album in late January 1973, the inclusion of the McCartneys was vetoed. This was because Waters felt his responses were too defensive and professional. Clary Torry's vocal on "The Great Gig in the Sky", which was recorded on 21 January 1973, would also be added to the collage.

Composition
The song itself is a sound collage, which features no lyrics (although it contains parts of the conversation tapes that Pink Floyd recorded, as well a short snippet of Clare Torry's vocal performance on "The Great Gig in the Sky"), and consists of a series of sound effects. It leads into the first performance piece on the album, "Breathe". As a result, they are usually played together on the radio, and most later re-releases merge the two songs.

Sound effects
Noticeable sound and instrument effects include:

Heartbeat; this can also be heard at the end of "Eclipse"
Clock ticking, also heard in "Time"
Manic laughter of Peter Watts, also heard in "Brain Damage"
Cash register, paper tearing, and coins falling, also heard in "Money"
Helicopter noise, also heard in "On the Run"
Clare Torry's scream, also heard in "The Great Gig in the Sky"
Backwards piano chord, which leads into "Breathe"

Spoken parts

Personnel
Nick Mason – percussion, tape effects, tape loops
Roger Waters – tape effects, tape loops
Richard Wright – reversed piano

References
Footnotes

Citations

1973 songs
Pink Floyd songs
Experimental music compositions
Rock instrumentals
Songs written by Nick Mason
Song recordings produced by David Gilmour
Song recordings produced by Roger Waters
Song recordings produced by Richard Wright (musician)
Song recordings produced by Nick Mason

he:The Dark Side of the Moon#Speak to Me